Indian Council may refer to:

In India:

 Indian Council of Agricultural Research, the apex body in agriculture and related allied fields in New Delhi, India
 Indian Council of Forestry Research and Education, an autonomous organization under the Ministry of Environment and Forests in India
 Indian Council of Medical Research, the apex body in India for the formulation, coordination and promotion of biomedical research
 Indian Council of Social Science Research, an Indian government agency

In the United States:

 Indian American Public Education Advisory Council, an Indian-American advocacy group which opposes Hindu efforts to change textbooks
 Minnesota Indian Affairs Council, a liaison between the government of Minnesota and the Native American tribes in the state of Minnesota
 Northern California Indian Development Council, a private nonprofit corporation that annually provides services to 14,000 to 15,000 clients

See also
 Tribal Council